The following is a timeline of the history of the city of Columbia, South Carolina, USA.

18th-19th centuries

 1786 - Columbia established as state capital (previously located in Charleston).
 1788 - Columbia becomes part of the new US state of South Carolina.
 1795 - First Presbyterian Church congregation founded.
 1797 - Commission of Streets and Markets established.
 1801 - University of South Carolina was founded
 1803 - Washington Street Methodist builds the first church building in Columbia
 1804 - Columbia Library Society founded.
 1805
 Town chartered.
 John Taylor elected intendant (town leader).
 South Carolina College opens.
 1809 - First Baptist Church founded.
 1813 - Trinity Episcopal Church founded.
 1814 - State Legislative Library established.
 1824 - St. Peter's Roman Catholic Church built.
 1825 - March: Lafayette visits town.
 1830
 Columbia Theological Seminary active.
 Population: 3,310.
 1838 - Southern Chronicle newspaper begins publication.
 1840 - Population: 4,340.
 1842
 Railroad (Branchville-Columbia) begins operating.
 Arsenal Military Academy (the Citadel) established.
 1846 - J.T. Zealy daguerreotypist in business.
 1847 - Southern Presbyterian Review begins publication.
 1850
 Carolina Times newspaper begins publication.
 Population: 6,060.
 1852 - Charlotte-Columbia railway begins operating.
 1853
 Greenville-Columbia railway begins operating.
 First Presbyterian Church building constructed.
 1854 - Office of mayor established.
 1856
 Town police force and Athenaeum established.
 South Carolina State Fair begins.
 1857
 Trinity Episcopal Cathedral building consecrated.
 Southern Guardian newspaper begins publication.
 1865
 February 17–18: Union forces in power; city burned.
 The Phoenix newspaper begins publication.
 1869 - South Carolina State House built.
 1870
 Benedict College founded.
 Area of city expands.
 1871 - October: "Southern States Convention of Colored Men" held in Columbia.
 1874 - State normal school opens.
 1875 - US Court House built.
 1880 - Population: 10,036.
 1891 - The State newspaper begins publication.
 1892 - Columbia Hospital established.
 1893 - Sidney Park Colored Methodist Episcopal Church built.
 1895 - Columbia Duck Mill begins operating.
 1896 - South Carolina Confederate Relic Room and Museum established.
 1897 - Columbia Record newspaper begins publication.
 1899 - Olympia Mill built.

20th century

 1908 - Main Street paved.
 1913
 National Corn Show held in city.
 Palmetto Building constructed.
 1917 - Military Camp Jackson established.
 1920 - Population: 37,524.
 1921 - Bethel A.M.E. Church built.
 1922 - February: Trolley strike.
 1924 - Town Theatre built.
 1925 - Part of North Columbia annexed to city.
 1926-7 - Capital Heights, Hollywood, Kilbourne Park, Rose Hill, and Rosewood annexed to city.
 1930
 Dreher Shoals Dam begins operating.
 WIS radio begins broadcasting.
 Belk's department store in business.
 1931 - Carolina Theatre opens.
 1932 - Thomas Woodrow Wilson Boyhood Home (museum) opens.
 1934 - Richland County Public Library established.
 1937
 US Courthouse becomes Columbia City Hall.
 Palmetto Theater opens.
 University South Caroliniana Society founded.
 1939
 WCOS radio begins broadcasting.
 Municipal Association of South Carolina headquartered in Columbia.
 1940
 Lexington County Airport built.
 US military Fort Jackson active.
 Population: 62,396.
 1941 - Carver Theatre built.
 1950
 Columbia Museum of Art and Twilite Drive-In cinema open.
 Population: 86,914.
 1953 - WIS-TV and WNOK-TV (television) begin broadcasting.
 1958 - Lester Bates becomes mayor.
 1960 - South Carolina Department of Corrections headquartered in city.
 1961
 Richland Mall in business.
 Historic Columbia Foundation established.
 1963 - Columbia Festival Orchestra founded.
 1966 - Hammond School founded.
 1968 - University of South Carolina's Carolina Coliseum opens.
 1970
 Dutch Square shopping mall in business.
 John Tucker Campbell becomes mayor.
 Population: 112,542.
 1974
 Riverbanks Zoo opens.
 Shambhala Center founded.
 1976 - WLTR radio begins broadcasting.
 1977 - Palmetto Alliance (antinuclear group) founded.
 1978 - Kirkman Finlay becomes mayor.
 1979
 Masjid as-Salaam (Muslim center) built.
 Nickelodeon Theater opens.
 Columbia becomes part of Tree City USA.
 1980 - South Carolina Military Museum established.
 1981 - Harvest Hope Food Bank established.
 1983 - Chicora Foundation (historic preservation group) established.
 1984 - Hindu Temple built.
 1986 - T. Patton Adams becomes mayor.
 1987 - AT&T Building constructed.
 1988
 South Carolina State Museum opens in the former location of the vacant Columbia Mills Building.
 University of South Carolina's Koger Center for the Arts built.
 1990
 Bob Coble becomes mayor.
 Population: 110,852.
 1991 - Sidney Park opens.
 1992 - Masjid Al-Muslimiin (mosque) built.
 1993
 Richland County Public Library new main branch building opens.
 Jim Clyburn becomes U.S. representative for South Carolina's 6th congressional district.
 1994 - Sikh Religious Society founded.
 1996 - City website online.
 2000 - January 17: Confederate flag protest.

21st century

 2001 - Columbia Zen Buddhist Priory founded.
 2002
 Colonial Center (arena) opens.
 Central Midlands Regional Transit Authority and Ganden Mahayana Buddhist established.
 2005 - Columbia City Paper begins publication.
 2007 - Columbia Quadsquad (rollerderby league) formed.
 2009 - Fort Jackson National Cemetery established.
 2010
 Stephen K. Benjamin becomes first African-American in city elected mayor.
 Population: 129,272 city; 767,598 metro.

See also
 Columbia history
 List of mayors of Columbia, South Carolina
 National Register of Historic Places listings in Columbia, South Carolina
 List of museums in Columbia, South Carolina
 Timeline of South Carolina
 Timeline of Charleston, South Carolina

References

Bibliography

 
 
 
 . + Chronology

External links

 
 . Includes maps, photos, city records, city directories, etc.
 
 
 
 Items related to Columbia, S.C., various dates (via Digital Public Library of America).

 
Columbia
Columbia
Years in South Carolina